Bach is a biannual peer-reviewed academic journal published by the Riemenschneider Bach Institute at Baldwin Wallace University. It covers the study of Johann Sebastian Bach and Baroque music. The journal was established in 1970, and the 2016–2017 guest editor is Mary Greer (Cambridge, Massachusetts, U.S.).

External links 
 

Johann Sebastian Bach
Music journals
Biannual journals
Publications established in 1970
English-language journals
Baldwin Wallace University
1970 establishments in Ohio